Capital punishment is a legal penalty in Mauritania. However, it is considered "Abolitionist in Practice" due to having a moratorium on executions since 1987. Mauritania last executed in 1987.

Mauritania has an unenforced death penalty for homosexuality; there have been no reported death sentences for homosexual acts. Mauritania also has the death penalty for blasphemy. A law was passed in 2018 making capital punishment the mandatory sentence for blasphemy.

References

Mauritania
Law of Mauritania